Canadian white bread is a style of bread produced or sold by companies including Pepperidge Farm, Trader Joe's and Bimbo Bakeries USA, that has a heartier texture than the white bread typically found throughout the United States and Canada.

Protein content
Because the Canadian Grain Commission requires relatively high amounts of protein in Canadian wheat, Canadian white flour usually has a protein content of 12 or 13%. This contributes to the consistency of Canadian bread.

See also
 Manitoba flour
 Sandwich bread

References
Notes

Breads
Canadian cuisine